Saïd Chiba ( – born 28 September 1970, Rabat) is a retired Moroccan football defensive midfielder and currently the manager of CR Al Hoceima.

He played for several clubs, including Al-Hilal (Saudi Arabia), SD Compostela (Spain), AS Nancy (France) and Aris Thessaloniki in Greece. He also had a short spell with Motherwell (Scotland).

He played for the Morocco national football team and was a participant at the 1998 FIFA World Cup.

References

External links

Saïd Chiba at Footballdatabase

1970 births
Living people
Moroccan footballers
Footballers from Rabat
Morocco international footballers
Al Hilal SFC players
SD Compostela footballers
AS Nancy Lorraine players
Motherwell F.C. players
Qatar SC players
Sharjah FC players
Khor Fakkan Sports Club players
Fath Union Sport players
Scottish Premier League players
Aris Thessaloniki F.C. players
Saudi Professional League players
La Liga players
Ligue 1 players
Ligue 2 players
Qatar Stars League players
UAE Pro League players
1998 African Cup of Nations players
1998 FIFA World Cup players
2000 African Cup of Nations players
Moroccan expatriate footballers
Expatriate footballers in Saudi Arabia
Expatriate footballers in Spain
Expatriate footballers in France
Expatriate footballers in Scotland
Expatriate footballers in Greece
Expatriate footballers in Qatar
Expatriate footballers in the United Arab Emirates
Moroccan expatriate sportspeople in Saudi Arabia
Moroccan expatriate sportspeople in Spain
Moroccan expatriate sportspeople in Greece
Moroccan expatriate sportspeople in France
Moroccan expatriate sportspeople in Scotland
Moroccan expatriate sportspeople in Qatar
Moroccan expatriate sportspeople in the United Arab Emirates
Moroccan football managers
Qatar SC managers
Expatriate football managers in Qatar
Association football midfielders
Competitors at the 1993 Mediterranean Games
Mediterranean Games bronze medalists for Morocco
Mediterranean Games medalists in football